Betty Aberlin (born Betty Kay Ageloff, December 30, 1942) is an American actress, poet, and writer. She is best known as Lady Aberlin on Mister Rogers' Neighborhood, a role she played for the entirety of the show's 33-year run.

Life and career

Born Betty Kay Ageloff in New York City, Aberlin grew up in a Jewish family and attended public schools in Queens and Staten Island. In Staten Island, she attended Curtis High School, graduating in 1959.  She graduated from Bennington College, having studied art, modern dance, and literature with Howard Nemerov and Bernard Malamud.

She made her debut at the Phoenix Theatre in 1954 in Sandhog, a folk-opera by Waldo Salt and Earl Robinson.

Aberlin had a regular role as Lady Aberlin for 33 years on the children's television series Mister Rogers' Neighborhood. Lady Aberlin was King Friday's niece and frequently the "main" character of the Neighborhood of Make-Believe segments. Often the only full-sized character in the segments, she acted as something of a level-headed older sister to the puppets and audience alike, and an audience surrogate, providing exposition for the story's narrative. She could occasionally be seen dancing around the Neighborhood whenever she was by herself. Sometimes nicknamed "Lady A," she also sometimes acted as a surrogate mother to Daniel Tiger.

She also appeared on The Smothers Brothers Show (1975) and various TV spots. For a short time she did a late-night radio show on WYEP-FM in Pittsburgh, a station she helped found. The program featured jazz, comedy, and some spoken arts and poetry. WYEP is a non-commercial, community-supported station for progressive music, arts, and public affairs. Aberlin wrote and performed a sequence for ACRE TV's The 90's—"Stop Me Before I Love Again"—in a theme show on growing older, which aired on PBS.

Aberlin played back-up singer Cheryl and later starred as Heather in the 1978 Joseph Papp production of Cryer & Ford's I'm Getting My Act Together and Taking it on the Road at the New York Shakespeare Festival's Public Theater in New York and on the road.

In 1980–1981, Aberlin played Meryl Streep's sister in Elizabeth Swados' Alice in Concert, based on Alice in Wonderland, both at The Public Theater and in a 1982 television version, Alice at the Palace.

Later in her career, Aberlin formed a kinship with Kevin Smith and appeared in a number of his films, including Dogma (1999), Jersey Girl (2004), Zack and Miri Make a Porno (2008), and Red State (2011).

Writings
As a contribution to the literary web site "Fresh Yarn", Aberlin's essay The Blonding of America was published in 2005. In the essay, she comments on privilege and physical appearance. The point of departure for her reflection is the purchase of a blonde wig to hide her first gray hairs. Wearing the wig, Aberlin is aware of how it erases racial or ethnic features and how her new look evokes a more glamorous feminine stereotype. She observes how this change to her appearance effects a change of consciousness: "I put [the wig] on, and I don't even notice the homeless anymore." She concludes the essay: "Later on that evening, I saw a yellow school bus, filled with Chasidim. On the sooty back window of the bus, someone had drawn a swastika. I'll tell you...it certainly feels a little safer....being blonde."

In 2008, Aberlin published a collection of poems, The White Page Poems, as a companion to A Book of Strife, in the Form of the Diary of an Old Soul, an 1880 collection of poems by George MacDonald. The original edition of MacDonald's book had a blank page opposite each poem.

In popular culture

Musician Jonathan Coulton wrote the song "Lady Aberlin's Muumuu" about Aberlin's Mister Rogers character.

References

External links
 
 
 
 

1942 births
Living people
20th-century American actresses
20th-century American poets
Actresses from New York City
American film actresses
American television actresses
American women poets
Bennington College alumni
Jewish American actresses
Jewish American poets
20th-century American women writers
21st-century American Jews
21st-century American actresses